Eric Walter Barnard  (13 July 1924 – 21 April 2017) was an Australian politician.

Barnard was born in Mole Creek, Tasmania. He was the nephew of Claude Barnard and the cousin of Lance Barnard, also politicians.

In 1959 he was elected to the Tasmanian House of Assembly as a Labor member for Franklin. He served as Speaker from 1972 to 1975 and as Minister for Primary Industry from 1975 to 1979, when he resigned his seat and left politics.

He was made a Member of the Order of Australia (AM) in 1980. In 2001, he was awarded the Centenary Medal in honour of his service to the community.

References

1924 births
2017 deaths
Australian Labor Party members of the Parliament of Tasmania
Members of the Tasmanian House of Assembly
Members of the Order of Australia
Speakers of the Tasmanian House of Assembly
Royal Australian Navy personnel of World War II